Lewis Carter-Jones CBE (17 November 1920 – 26 August 2004) was a British Labour Party politician.

Early life
Carter-Jones was educated at Bridgend County School and University College of Wales, Aberystwyth. He was head of business studies at Yale Grammar Technical School, Wrexham, and a rugby union referee.

Parliamentary career
Carter-Jones contested Chester in a 1956 by-election and at the 1959 general election. He was Member of Parliament for Eccles from 1964 general election until he retired at the 1987 general election.  His successor was Joan Lestor.

References
The Times Guide to the House of Commons, Times Newspapers Ltd, 1966 & 1983
Whitkaker's Almanack 2005

External links 
 

1920 births
2004 deaths
Labour Party (UK) MPs for English constituencies
UK MPs 1964–1966
UK MPs 1966–1970
UK MPs 1970–1974
UK MPs 1974
UK MPs 1974–1979
UK MPs 1979–1983
UK MPs 1983–1987
Alumni of Aberystwyth University
Commanders of the Order of the British Empire